Michael Green is an American writer and producer. In addition to writing for television, Green has written or co-written several feature film screenplays, including Logan, Alien: Covenant, Blade Runner 2049 and Murder on the Orient Express, all released in 2017. For Logan, which he co-wrote with James Mangold and Scott Frank, Green was nominated for an Academy Award for Best Adapted Screenplay.

Life and career
Green grew up in Mamaroneck, New York, the son of a real estate developer. His family is Jewish, and his mother is Israeli. He attended Stanford University. After graduating, Green came back to New York and hustled his way into a junior development job at HBO, where he spent his workday reading other writers' scripts.

Green's first television writing credit was on Sex and the City. He was the creator and writer of the 2009 NBC series Kings, a drama based on the biblical story of King David but set in an alternate present. Other television credits also include Everwood, Smallville, Jack and Bobby and Heroes.

In 2007, Green, along with the rest of the Heroes writing staff, was nominated for an Emmy for Outstanding Drama Series and the WGA Award for New Series. Heroes won for Favorite New TV Drama at the 33rd annual People's Choice Awards.

In 2009, Green was hired by 20th Century Fox to pen an early draft of Fantastic Four with Akiva Goldsman producing.

Green's feature writing career began with Green Lantern in 2011. He wrote or co-wrote four films released in 2017: James Mangold's Logan, Ridley Scott's Alien: Covenant, Denis Villeneuve's Blade Runner 2049, and Kenneth Branagh's Murder on the Orient Express.

He developed, wrote and is an executive producer for the Starz series American Gods with Bryan Fuller. It is adapted from Neil Gaiman's novel of the same name.

In November 2017, Death on the Nile, an adaptation of the novel of the same name, was reported to be in active development with Green returning as screenwriter. By February 2018, Branagh and Green were both confirmed to return as director and writer respectively. More recently, he signed an overall deal with Netflix.

Comic books
A contributor to DC Comics, Green is the author and co-author of several graphic novels, including Batman: Lovers and Madmen. He co-wrote Superman/Batman and the reboot of Supergirl, with Mike Johnson as well as the Blade Runner comic series Blade Runner 2019.

Filmography

Television

Feature films

Bibliography
 Batman: Lovers and Madmen (2008)
 Superman/Batman: The Search for Kryptonite (2008)
 Superman/Batman: Finest Worlds (2009)
 Supergirl, Volume 1: Last Daughter of Krypton (2012)
 Supergirl, Volume 2: Girl in the World (2013)
 Blade Runner 2019 (2019)
 Blade Runner 2029 (2020)

Awards and nominations
 Emmy Award: Outstanding Drama Series – Heroes (2007 nomination shared with Tim Kring, (executive producer), Dennis Hammer (executive producer), Allan Arkush (executive producer), Greg Beeman (co-executive producer), Jesse Alexander (co-executive producer), Jeph Loeb (co-executive producer), Bryan Fuller (co-executive producer), Natalie Chaidez (co-executive producer), James Chory (produced by), Adam Armus (supervising producer), and Nora Kay Foster
 Writers Guild of America Award: New Series – Heroes (2007)
 Academy Awards: Best Adapted Screenplay nomination shared with James Mangold and Scott Frank for Logan (2018).

References

External links
 
 Official Kings site
 andmichaelgreen on Twitter

American television writers
Television producers from New York (state)
American male screenwriters
Jewish American writers
People from Mamaroneck, New York
Year of birth missing (living people)
Living people
American male television writers
Screenwriters from New York (state)
American people of Israeli descent
21st-century American Jews